Spandau Prison was located in the borough of Spandau in West Berlin. It was originally a military prison, built in 1876, but became a proto-concentration camp under the Nazis. After the war, it held seven top Nazi leaders convicted in the Nuremberg trials. After the death of its last prisoner, Rudolf Hess, in August 1987, the prison was demolished and replaced by a shopping centre for the British forces stationed in Germany to prevent it from becoming a neo-Nazi shrine.

History 
Spandau Prison was built in 1876 on Wilhelmstraße. It initially served as a military detention center of the Prussian Army. From 1919 it was also used for civilian inmates. It held up to 600 inmates at that time.

In the aftermath of the Reichstag fire of 1933, opponents of Hitler, and journalists such as Egon Kisch and Carl von Ossietzky, were held there in so-called protective custody. Spandau Prison became a sort of predecessor of the Nazi concentration camps. While it was formally operated by the Prussian Ministry of Justice, the Gestapo tortured and abused its inmates, as Kisch recalled in his memories of the prison. By the end of 1933 the first Nazi concentration camps had been erected (at Dachau, Osthofen, Oranienburg, Sonnenburg, Lichtenburg and the marshland camps around Esterwegen); all remaining prisoners who had been held in so-called protective custody in state prisons were transferred to these concentration camps.

After World War II the prison fell in the British Sector of what became West Berlin but it was operated by the Four-Power Authorities to house the Nazi war criminals sentenced to imprisonment at the Nuremberg Trials.

Only seven prisoners were finally imprisoned there. Arriving from Nuremberg on 18 July 1947, they were:

Of the seven, three were released after serving their full sentences, while three others (including Raeder and Funk, who were given life sentences) were released earlier due to ill health. Between 1966 and 1987, Rudolf Hess was the only inmate in  the prison and his only companion was the warden, Eugene K. Bird, who became a close friend. Bird wrote a book about Hess's imprisonment titled The Loneliest Man in the World.

Spandau was one of only two Four-Power organizations to continue to operate after the breakdown of the Allied Control Council; the other was the Berlin Air Safety Center. The four occupying powers of Berlin alternated control of the prison on a monthly basis, each having the responsibility for a total of three months out of the year. Observing the Four-Power flags that flew at the Allied Control Authority building could determine who controlled the prison.

The prison was demolished in August 1987, largely to prevent it from becoming a neo-Nazi shrine, after the death of its final remaining prisoner, Rudolf Hess. To further ensure its erasure, the site was made into a parking facility and a shopping center, named The Britannia Centre Spandau and nicknamed Hessco's after the well known British supermarket chain, Tesco. All materials from the demolished prison were ground to powder and dispersed in the North Sea or buried at the former RAF Gatow airbase, with the exception of a single set of keys now exhibited in the regimental museum of the King's Own Scottish Borderers at Berwick Barracks.

The prison

In addition, some of the sixty soldiers on guard duty manned six machine-gun armed guard towers 24 hours a day. Due to the number of cells available, an empty cell was left between the prisoners' cells, to avoid the possibility of prisoners' communicating in Morse code. Other remaining cells in the wing were designated for other purposes, with one used for the prison library and another for a chapel.

Garden

The highlight of the prison, from the inmates' perspective, was the garden. Very spacious given the small number of prisoners using it, the garden space was initially divided into small personal plots that were used by each prisoner in various ways, usually to grow vegetables. Dönitz favoured growing beans, Funk tomatoes and Speer daisies, although the Soviet director subsequently banned flowers for a time. By regulation, all of the produce was to be put toward use in the prison kitchen, but prisoners and guards alike often skirted this rule and indulged in the garden's offerings. As prison regulations slackened and as prisoners became either apathetic or too ill to maintain their plots, the garden was consolidated into one large workable area. This suited the former architect Speer, who, being one of the youngest and liveliest of the inmates, later took up the task of refashioning the entire plot of land into a large complex garden, complete with paths, rock gardens and floral displays. On days without access to the garden, for instance when it was raining, the prisoners occupied their time making envelopes together in the main corridor.

Underutilization

The Allied powers originally requisitioned the prison in November 1946, expecting it to accommodate a hundred or more war criminals. Besides the sixty or so soldiers on duty in or around the prison at any given time, there were teams of professional civilian warders from each of the four countries, four prison directors and their deputies, four army medical officers, cooks, translators, waiters, porters and others. This was perceived as a drastic misallocation of resources and became a serious point of contention among the prison directors, politicians from their respective countries, and especially the West Berlin government, who were left to foot the bill for Spandau yet suffered from a lack of space in their own prison system. The debate surrounding the imprisonment of seven war criminals in such a large space, with numerous and expensive complementary staff, was only heightened as time went on and prisoners were released.

Acrimony reached its peak after the release of Speer and Schirach in 1966, leaving only one inmate, Hess, remaining in an otherwise under-utilized prison. Various proposals were made to remedy this situation over the years, ranging from moving the prisoners to an appropriately sized wing of another larger, occupied prison, to releasing them; house arrest was also considered. Nevertheless, an official refraining order went into effect, forbidding the approaching of unsettled prisoners, and so the prison remained exclusively for the seven war criminals for the remainder of its existence.

Life in the prison

Prison regulations

Every facet of life in the prison was strictly set out by an intricate prison regulation scheme designed before the prisoners' arrival by the Four Powers – France, Britain, the Soviet Union, and the United States. Compared with other established prison regulations at the time, Spandau's rules were quite strict. The prisoners' outgoing letters to families were at first limited to one page every month, talking with fellow prisoners was prohibited, newspapers were banned, diaries and memoirs were forbidden, visits by families were limited to fifteen minutes every two months, and lights were flashed into the prisoners' cells every fifteen minutes during the night as a form of suicide watch. A considerable portion of the stricter regulations was either later revised toward the more lenient, or deliberately ignored by prison staff.

The directors and guards of the Western powers (France, Britain, and the United States) repeatedly voiced opposition to many of the stricter measures and made near-constant protest about them to their superiors throughout the prison's existence, but they were invariably vetoed by the Soviet Union, which favored a tougher approach. The Soviet Union, which suffered between 10 and 19 million civilian deaths during the war and had pressed at the Nuremberg trials for the execution of all the current inmates, was unwilling to compromise with the Western powers in this regard, both because of the harsher punishment that they felt was justified, and to stress the Communist propaganda line that the capitalist powers had supposedly never been serious about denazification. This contrasted with Werl Prison, which housed hundreds of former officers and other lower-ranking Nazi men who were under a comparatively lax regime. However, a more contemporary consideration was that the continued incarceration of even one Nazi (i.e. Hess) in Spandau ensured a conduit that guaranteed the Soviets access to West Berlin would remain open, and Western commentators frequently accused the Russians of keeping Spandau prison in operation chiefly as a centre for Soviet espionage operations.

Daily life

Every day, prisoners were ordered to rise at 6 a.m., wash, clean their cells and the corridor together, eat breakfast, stay in the garden until lunch-time at noon (weather permitting), have a post-lunch rest in their cells, and then return to the garden. Supper followed at 5 p.m., after which the prisoners were returned to their cells. Lights out was at 10 p.m. Prisoners received a shave and a haircut, if necessary, on Mondays, Wednesdays, or Fridays; they did their own laundry every Monday. This routine, except the time allowed in the garden, changed very little throughout the years, although each of the controlling nations made their own interpretation of the prison regulations.

Within a few years of their arrival at the prison, all sorts of illicit lines of communication with the outside world were opened for the inmates by sympathetic staff. These supplementary lines were free of the censorship placed on authorised communications, and were also virtually unlimited in volume, ordinarily occurring on either Sundays or Thursdays (except during times of total lock-down of exchanges). Every piece of paper given to the prisoners was recorded and tracked, so secret notes were most often written by other means, where the supply went officially unmonitored for the entire duration of the prison's existence. Many inmates took full advantage of this. Albert Speer, after having his official request to write his memoirs denied, finally began setting down his experiences and perspectives of his time with the Nazi regime, which were smuggled out and later released as a bestselling book, Inside the Third Reich. Dönitz wrote letters to his former deputy regarding the protection of his prestige in the outside world. When his release was near, he gave instructions to his wife on how best she could help ease his transition back into politics, which he intended, but never actually accomplished. Walther Funk managed to obtain a seemingly constant supply of cognac (all alcohol was banned) and other treats that he would share with other prisoners on special occasions.

The Spandau Seven

The prisoners, still subject to the petty personal rivalries and battles for prestige that characterized Nazi party politics, divided themselves into groups: Albert Speer and Rudolf Hess were the loners, generally disliked by the others – the former for his admission of guilt and repudiation of Hitler at the Nuremberg trials, the latter for his antisocial personality and perceived mental instability. The two former Grand admirals, Erich Raeder and Karl Dönitz, stayed together, despite their heated mutual dislike. This situation had come about when Dönitz replaced Raeder as Commander in Chief of the German navy in 1943. Baldur von Schirach and Walther Funk were described as "inseparable". Konstantin von Neurath was, being a former diplomat, amiable and amenable to all the others.

Despite the length of time they spent with each other, remarkably little progress was made in the way of reconciliation. A notable example was Dönitz's dislike of Speer being steadfastly maintained for his entire 10-year sentence, with it only coming to a head during the last few days of his imprisonment. Dönitz always believed that Hitler had named him as his successor due to Speer's recommendation, which had led to Dönitz being tried at Nuremberg (Speer always denied this).

There is also a collection of medical reports concerning Baldur von Schirach, Albert Speer, and Rudolf Hess made during their confinement at Spandau which have survived.

Albert Speer

Erich Raeder and Karl Dönitz

"The Admiralty", as the other prisoners referred to Dönitz and Raeder, were often teamed together for various tasks. Raeder, with a liking for rigid systems and organization, designated himself as chief librarian of the prison library, with Dönitz as his assistant. Each designed their own sleeve insignia for both chief librarian (a silver book) and assistant chief librarian (a gold book) which were woven with the appropriate colored thread. Both men often withheld themselves from the other prisoners, with Dönitz claiming for his entire ten years in prison that he was still the rightful head of the German state (he also got one vote in the 1954 West German presidential election), and Raeder having contempt for the insolence and lack of discipline endemic in his nonmilitary fellow prisoners. Despite preferring to stay together, the two of them continued their wartime feud and argued most of the time over whether Raeder's battleships or Dönitz's U-boats were responsible for losing the war. This feud often resulted in fights. After Dönitz's release in 1956 he wrote two books, one on his early life, My Ever-Changing Life, and one on his time as an admiral, Ten Years and Twenty Days. Raeder, in failing health and seemingly close to death, was released in 1955 and died in 1960.

Rudolf Hess

Rudolf Hess, sentenced to life but not released due to ill health as were Raeder, Funk, or Neurath, served the longest sentence out of the seven and was by far the most demanding of the prisoners. Regarded as being the 'laziest man in Spandau', Hess avoided all forms of work that he deemed below his dignity, such as pulling weeds. He was the only one of the seven who almost never attended the prison's Sunday church service. A paranoid hypochondriac, he repeatedly complained of all forms of illness, mostly stomach pains, and was suspicious of all food given to him, always taking the dish placed farthest away from him as a means of avoiding being poisoned. His alleged stomach pains often caused wild and excessive moans and cries of pain throughout the day and night and their authenticity was repeatedly the subject of debate between the prisoners and the prison directors.

Raeder, Dönitz, and Schirach were contemptuous of this behaviour and viewed them as cries for attention or as means to avoid work. Speer and Funk, acutely aware of the likely psychosomatic nature of the illness, were more accommodating to Hess. Speer, in a move that invoked the ire of his fellow prisoners, would often tend to Hess's needs, bringing him his coat when he was cold and coming to his defence when a director or guard was attempting to coax Hess out of bed and into work. Hess occasionally wailed in pain at night, affecting the sleep of the other prisoners. The prison's medical officer would inject Hess with what was described as a "sedative" but was in reality distilled water and succeeded in putting Hess to sleep. The fact that Hess repeatedly shirked duties the others had to bear and received other preferential treatment because of his illness irked the other prisoners, and earned him the title of "His imprisoned Lordship" by the admirals, who often mocked him and played mean-spirited pranks on him. 

Hess was also unique among the prisoners in that, as a matter of dignity, he refused all visitors for more than twenty years, finally consenting to see his adult son and wife in 1969 after suffering from a perforated ulcer that required treatment at a hospital outside the prison. Fearing for his mental health now that he was the sole remaining inmate, and assuming that his death was imminent, the prison directors agreed to slacken most of the remaining regulations, moving Hess to the more spacious former chapel space, giving him a water heater to allow the making of tea or coffee when he liked, and permanently unlocking his cell so that he could freely access the prison's bathing facilities and library.

Hess was frequently moved from room to room every night for security reasons. He was often taken to the British Military Hospital not far from the prison, where the entire second floor of the hospital was cordoned off for him. He remained under heavy guard while in hospital. Ward security was provided by soldiers including Royal Military Police Close Protection personnel. External security was provided by one of the British infantry battalions then stationed in Berlin. On some unusual occasions, the Soviets relaxed their strict regulations; during these times Hess was allowed to spend extra time in the prison garden, and one of the warders from the superpowers took Hess outside the prison walls for a stroll and sometimes dinner at a nearby Berlin restaurant in a private room.

In popular culture
The British band Spandau Ballet got their name after a friend of the band, journalist and DJ Robert Elms, saw the words 'Spandau Ballet' scrawled on the wall of a nightclub lavatory during a visit to Berlin. The graffiti referred to the way a condemned individual would twitch and "dance" at the end of the rope due to the standard drop method of hangings used at Spandau Prison and was in the tradition of similar gallows humour expressions such as "dancing the Tyburn jig."

The prison featured in the 1985 film Wild Geese II, about a fictional group of mercenaries who are assigned to kidnap Rudolf Hess (played by Laurence Olivier), and in the book Spandau Phoenix by Greg Iles, which is a fictional account of Hess and Spandau Prison.

See also
Land of the Blind
 Cold War
 Landsberg Prison in Bavaria
 Spandau Citadel
 Sugamo Prison in Tokyo, Japan
 Speer und Er (Extensive footage of the prison recreated in a studio)

References
Notes

.
Bibliography

 
 
 
 
 
 Goda, Norman J.W.: Tales from Spandau. Nazi Criminals and the Cold War (New York: Cambridge Univ. Press, 2007).

External links

 Spandau Prison on Western Allies Berlin Website
 A first hand account from a serving British officer of guarding Rudolf Hess in Spandau Prison

1876 establishments in Germany
Government buildings completed in 1876
Buildings and structures demolished in 1987
Defunct prisons in Germany
Buildings and structures in Spandau
Allied occupation of Germany
Rudolf Hess
1987 disestablishments in Germany
Demolished prisons
Demolished buildings and structures in Berlin